Yetiv (יְ֚תִיב) is a cantillation mark found in the Torah, Haftarah, and other books of the Hebrew Bible. It is found in the Katon group in some occurrences in lieu of the more common Mahpach-Pashta clause, generally on one- or two-syllable words.

The Yetiv uses the same < symbol as the Mahpach, but when it is present, the < comes at the beginning of the word, unlike in a Mahpach, it is placed under the letter of the first syllable that is stressed. It is found to the right of the vowel. There is also no Pashta. In print, the Yetiv will sometimes be distinguished from the Mahapach by being more acutely angled, but in the identical position. 

Yetiv occurs in the Torah 356 times.

The Hebrew word יְ֚תִיב translates into English as sitting.

Total occurrences

Melody
The Yetiv starts off with a very high note, then drops low very suddenly.

References

Cantillation marks